Gabriel Podoski was one of the Polish nobles in Russian service and supported their position. He was one of the leaders of the Radom Confederation, a supporter of the cardinal laws and a supporter of August III of Poland, opponent of king Stanisław August Poniatowski.

References

External links
 Virtual tour Gniezno Cathedral  
List of Primates of Poland 
Gabriel Jan Podoski

Ecclesiastical senators of the Polish–Lithuanian Commonwealth
1719 births
1777 deaths
Archbishops of Gniezno
18th-century Roman Catholic archbishops in the Polish–Lithuanian Commonwealth
Radom confederates